Alina Tecșor (born 29 October 1979) is a professional Romanian retired tennis player and current captain of the Romania Fed Cup team. On 9 September 1996, she reached her highest WTA singles ranking of 364 whilst her best doubles ranking was 529 on 7 October 1996.

ITF Singles Circuit finals: 3 (1–2)

References

External links

1979 births
Living people
People from Alexandria, Romania
Romanian female tennis players